Nel mondo delle donne is the fourth album from Italian singer Anna Tatangelo.

Track listing

2008 albums
Anna Tatangelo albums

tr:Nel Mondo Delle Donne